Nuannuan District, also Nuan Nuan, is a district of the city of Keelung, Taiwan.

History

During the period of Japanese rule,  included modern day Nuannuan and Qidu District and was governed under  of Taihoku Prefecture.

Geography
 Area: 22.8283 km2
 Population: 38,422 people (February 2023)

Administrative divisions
The district consists of thirteen urban villages:
 Baxi/Basi, Badu, Banan, Guogang, Dingnei, Dinghe, Nuantong, Nuannuan, Nuandong/Nuantung, Nuanxi/Nuansi, Bazhong/Bajhong, Dingan/Ding-an/Ding'an and Dingxiang/Dingsiang Village.

Tourist attractions 
 Nuannuan Ande Temple (暖暖安德宮)
 Chinshan Temple (金山寺)
 Haihue Temple
 Hsishih Reservoir
 Nuannuan Sport Park
 Nuantung Nursery Garden
 Nuantung Nursery Garden Farm Park
 Potholes at Nuanchiang Bridge

Transportation

 TRA Badu Station
 TRA Nuannuan Station

Notable natives
 Jiang Yi-huah, Premier of the Republic of China (2013–2014)

See also
 Keelung

References

External links

  

Districts of Keelung